The Garden Company Limited is a Hong Kong-based bakery and confectionery manufacturer. The company was one of the first Chinese owned businesses created to sell modern-style food products in the territory.  They also made bread and confectionery more affordable for lower-income earners.

History
Founded in 1926 by cousins Tse Fong Cheung and Wah O. Wong in Kowloon with a single bakery. The company's name is named after the Hong Kong Zoological and Botanical Gardens.

Garden is traditionally a Chinese company and supplied bread to the Chinese army during World War II. The firm closed operations during the Japanese occupation of Hong Kong from 1941 to 1945. The company expanded with the growth of Hong Kong before and after World War II and benefited from the influx of immigrants. In the 1956 riot Garden Bakery's Kowloon factory was destroyed and the colonial government awarded it HK$743,000 in compensation in 1957. 

In the 1980s and 1990s, Garden products were shipped overseas to Chinese communities around the world.

Today, the company remains family (Cheung family) owned with several joint ventures with other Chinese firms. It is one of few Hong Kong firms with operations still in Hong Kong.

Product lines

 bread
 snacks
 scones
 buns
 speciality breads
 egg rolls
 cakes and mixes
 army bread (1940s)

Production facilities

 Sham Tseng
 13,000 square metres (1962)
 2nd expansion (1974)
 3rd expansion (1982)
 4th expansion - 50,000 square metres (1992)
 5th expansion - 70,000-square metres (2000)
 Kowloon
 1st bakery (1926–1935)
 expansion - 475-square metres (1935–1938)
 expansion - 1,400-square metres (1938–1941)
 expansion (1947–1951)
 expansion - 7,000 square metres (1951–1958)
 expansion - 10,000 square metres (1958-?)
 Central
 2nd bakery (1927–1935)
 Sham Shui Po (1931–1934)
 Hua Jia Foodstuff Company, Dongguan, China (1985)
 Gong Yang Foodstuff Company, Jiangsu, China (2000)

See also
 List of food companies
 San Miguel Brewery Hong Kong
 Vitasoy
 Manufacturing in Hong Kong

References

External links

 
 Antiquities Advisory Board. Historic Building Appraisal: Building of The Garden Company, Limited (Sham Shui Po)

Food manufacturers of Hong Kong
Food and drink companies established in 1926
1926 establishments in Hong Kong
Sham Tseng
Former companies in the Hang Seng Index
Hong Kong brands